This article is part of the history of rail transport by country series

The history of rail transport in Greece began in 1869, with the construction of the link between Piraeus and Athens with private funding.

The Greek railway network then developed slowly over time, at the initiative of private foreign companies, with the adoption of a four gauge network: 600, 750, 1,000 and 1,435 mm.

Some of the network was inherited as a result of annexation of Greek territory that had been part of the Ottoman Empire.

See also

Hellenic Railways Organisation
History of Greece
Rail transport in Greece

References

External links
 
 Society of the Friends of the Greek Railways 
 Verein der Freunde der Peloponnesbahnen